Rampurhat Junction railway station is one of the busiest railway stations of Eastern Railway zone and it is the largest and busiest railway station of Birbhum district of West Bengal. It is a "NSG-3" category station. The station is under Howrah railway division is the 3rd busiest station in this division after Howrah and Burdwan railway station. It is 207 kilometres (shortest route) away from Howrah Junction. This station is famous for its connectivity with the neighbouring districts and states and also for the Hindu pilgrims visiting to Tarapith Maa Tara Temple which is just 9 km away from the station. Station code RPH, it is the railway station serving the city of Rampurhat. Rampurhat station is connected to Kolkata, Bhubaneswar, Vishakhapatnam, Hyderabad, Chennai, Kanyakumari, Bengaluru, Kochi, Thiruvananthapuram, Mumbai, Surat, Delhi, Gaya, Ranchi, Asansol, Jamalpur, Bhagalpur, Siliguri, Guwahati, Dibrugarh, Silchar, Agartala and almost every part of India. More than 100 express and passengers trains including 22 originating trains pass through the Rampurhat station everyday. This station has also a Marshalling Yard for Goods Trains and carshed for passenger rakes and engines.

Newly Constructed Track 

The track from Dumka to Rampurhat become operational in June 2015.  The distance between Jasidih and Rampurhat is reduced by 140 km, from previous about 270 km via Asansol.

Facilities 
The major facilities available are waiting rooms, computerized reservation facility, reservation counter, and two-wheeler vehicle parking. The vehicles are allowed to enter the station premises. This station has its own rail-crane. The station also has STD/ISD/PCO Telephone Booth, free WiFi (provided by Google), ATM Counter, Toilets, Food Court, Tea Stall and Book Stall. It also has a NON-AC Retiring room which can be booked online through IRCTC and also at the Office of the Senior Booking Clerk situated on platform 1.

Platforms
Rampurhat station has 6 platforms. It is a standard on ground structure with roof. There are escalators and lifts for all the platforms along with 2 foot overbridges.

See also 

 Dumka railway station
 Jasidih railway station
 Asansol Junction
 Howrah–Rampurhat Express
 List of railway stations in India

References

External links 

 Ministry of Railways. (Official site)

Railway stations in Birbhum district
Railway junction stations in West Bengal
Howrah railway division